Tiara Records was a record label, started in 1958 by Florence Greenberg. When she had a local hit with I Met Him on a Sunday (Ronde Ronde) by The Shirelles, she sold the group with the label to Decca Records for $4000. With that money she started Scepter Records in 1959.

See also
 List of record labels

American record labels
Record labels established in 1958
Record labels disestablished in 1959
1958 establishments in the United States